This is a list of flag bearers who have represented Ghana at the Olympics.

Flag bearers carry the national flag of their country at the opening ceremony of the Olympic Games.

See also
Ghana at the Olympics

References

Ghana at the Olympics
Ghana
Olympic flag bearers